Comerford Reservoir is a  impoundment located on the Connecticut River on the boundary between Vermont and New Hampshire in the United States. The reservoir is formed by the Frank D. Comerford Dam in the towns of Monroe, New Hampshire, and Barnet, Vermont, and impounds water into the towns of Littleton, New Hampshire, and Waterford, Vermont, nearly to the Moore Reservoir upstream on the Connecticut.

See also

List of lakes in New Hampshire
List of lakes in Vermont

References

Reservoirs in New Hampshire
Reservoirs in Vermont
Lakes of Grafton County, New Hampshire
Barnet, Vermont
Waterford, Vermont
Lakes of Caledonia County, Vermont